Cannery Row is a 1982 American comedy-drama film directed by David S. Ward in his directorial debut, starring Nick Nolte and Debra Winger.  The movie is adapted from John Steinbeck's novels Cannery Row (1945) and Sweet Thursday (1954).

Plot
The story is about the skid row denizens of Monterey, California, during World War II.  As declining fish stocks are shutting down a previously rich fishery and the dependent canning industry, bums and prostitutes lead colorful and adventurous lives in a balmy seaside setting.

Doc, a self-employed marine biologist, lives in a dockside warehouse and researches octopuses. Suzy DeSoto, a girl from the local bordello, is working there only out of necessity.

A collection of linked vignettes describes life on Cannery Row.  It is depicted as an impoverished area inhabited by a motley band of people who have experienced failures, but somehow have found their niche and a community of strangely kindred souls.

Doc and Suzy don't quite fit in, but are accepted. Mac and the boys gather frogs and sell them to give a surprise party for Doc, which turns into a brawl and breaks the tank housing Doc's octopus collection.  To make amends, they buy Doc a present of a microscope but mistakenly get him a telescope, instead.

A deeper mystery revolves around why Doc stays in Cannery Row. Suzy discovers that Doc was once a professional baseball pitcher but quit.

Another character, the Seer, spends his days playing his horn.  He depends on the gifts that mysteriously appear, such as groceries. Suzy eventually learns that the Seer is a former baseball player whom Doc injured with a pitch to the head, and now Doc takes care of him.  Doc and Suzy ultimately find love.

Cast 
 Nick Nolte as Doc Eddie Daniels
 Debra Winger as Suzy DeSoto
 Audra Lindley as Fauna
 M. Emmet Walsh as Mack
 Tom Mahoney as Hughie
 John Malloy as Jones
 James Keane as Eddie
 Sunshine Parker as Maxie "The Seer" Baker
 Rosanna DeSoto as Ellen Sedgewick
 Frank McRae as Hazel
 Santos Morales as Joseph and Mary
 Anne Lockhart as Barmaid
 John Huston as Narrator

Production
Raquel Welch was originally cast as Suzy but was fired after the first few days of production and replaced by actress Debra Winger, who was 15 years her junior. Welch sued the filmmakers for breach of contract. In the case, MGM claimed Welch was fired for being a "temperamental actress" whose behaviour caused the film to go overbudget. She insisted on doing her hair and make-up at home, and would refuse to co-operate with the director or producers unless she got her own way, thus breaching her $250,000 pay or play contract herself. Welch won the case, and was awarded a reported settlement of $10.8 million in court in 1986. The judgement was upheld at an appeal in 1990, but the whole affair tarnished Welch's reputation in Hollywood. After launching her lawsuit, Welch was never offered another starring role in a major motion picture again.

Reception

Critical reception
In his two-and-a-half star review, Chicago Sun-Times film critic Roger Ebert wrote of the film: "The movie is almost always good to look at, thanks to Richard MacDonald's sets (he linked together two giant sound stages) and Sven Nykvist's photography. And Nolte and Winger are almost able to make their relationship work, if only it didn't seem scripted out of old country songs and lonely hearts columns. It's tough to pull off a movie like this, in the semi-cynical 1980s (it would have been impossible in the truly cynical seventies). I guess we no longer believe in the essential heroism of the little guy, and in the proposition that anyone can succeed with a little luck." Vincent Canby of The New York Times dubbed the film 'precious nonsense' and felt it was a poor adaptation of Steinbeck. Variety praised Nolte and Winger's performance, but felt the material wasn't up to them.

Cannery Row holds a 71% rating on Rotten Tomatoes film review aggregator based on 7 reviews by critics.

MGM reaction
MGM head of production David Begelman later said he should not have greenlit the film, saying it "was beyond the reach of the filmmaker to realise the wonderful, wonderful values he had in a brilliant script."

References

External links
 
 
 
 

1982 films
1982 comedy-drama films
American comedy-drama films
1980s English-language films
Films scored by Jack Nitzsche
Films based on American novels
Films based on works by John Steinbeck
Films set in California
Films set in the 1940s
Films set in the San Francisco Bay Area
Films shot in California
Metro-Goldwyn-Mayer films
Films produced by Michael Phillips (producer)
1982 directorial debut films
1982 comedy films
1982 drama films
Films based on multiple works
Films directed by David S. Ward
1980s American films